The Croatia–Serbia basketball rivalry is a competitive sports rivalry that exists between the national basketball teams of the two countries and their respective sets of fans.

History

The big rivalry in basketball started at the FIBA European Championship in 1995, in Athens. At the time, Croatia was a newly independent state, while Serbia was a federal unit of FR Yugoslavia. Both countries did well in the tournament, with Yugoslavia ranking first. The third-place Croatian team caused an international scandal when they walked off the medal stand and out of the arena just before Serbs and Montenegrins were about to receive their gold medals. Curiously, there hasn't been a single direct game involving the two countries over the course of the championship.

Croatia and Yugoslavia did face each other in a game at EuroBasket 1997. Four seconds before the end of the tense game, Croatian team was leading by two points when Serbian guard Aleksandar Đorđević took the ball and made a three-pointer, winning the game for Yugoslavia. Yugoslavia went on to win the championship, while Croatia ended up ranking 11th overall.

Afterward, at EuroBasket 2001, Croats were heavily beaten by 80–66.

Serbia defeated Croatia, 86–83, in the last quarterfinal of the Olympic Basketball Tournament on 17 August 2016 to set up a semifinal clash with Australia. On 19 August, Serbia cruised to a resounding 87–61 win over Australia. Serbia won the silver medal following a 96–66 lost to the United States in the final. Croatia finished at 5th place.

Head-to-head

EuroBasket 1997

2000 Trofeo Lido delle Rose in Roseto, Italy 

 Croatia
Roster: Damir Mulaomerović (26), Vladimir Krstić (0), Josip Sesar (15), Davor Kus (dnp), Slaven Rimac (11), Matej Mamić (5), Jurica Ružić (2), Sandro Nicević (2), Mate Skelin (dnp), Nikola Vujčić (6), Žan Tabak (2)
Starters: Mulaomerović, Sesar, Mamić, Nicević, Tabak
Head coach: Aleksandar Petrović

 Yugoslavia
Roster: Dejan Bodiroga (20), Predrag Danilović (13), Saša Obradović (2), Nikola Lončar (0), Marko Jarić (0), Igor Rakočević (7), Dragan Lukovski (7), Željko Rebrača (10), Dragan Tarlać (6), Dejan Milojević (0), Dejan Tomašević (13), Milan Gurović (2)
Starters: Danilović, Obradović, Lončar, Tomašević, Rebrača
Head coach: Željko Obradović

Number in parentheses indicates points scored in the game.

EuroBasket 2001

2005 ProMonte Supercup in Podgorica 

 Serbia and Montenegro
Roster: Dejan Bodiroga (11), Aleksandar Pavlović (4), Vule Avdalović (0), Vladimir Radmanović (2), Igor Rakočević (12), Vlado Šćepanović (2), Marko Jarić (9), Bojan Popović (dnp), Nenad Krstić (16), Dejan Milojević (11), Darko Miličić (3), Milan Gurović (4)
Starters: Avdalović, Pavlović, Gurović, Milojević, Krstić
Head coach: Željko Obradović

 Croatia
Roster: Roko Ukić (9), Marino Baždarić (0), Marko Popović (0), Nikola Vujčić (1), Nikola Prkačin (0), Andrija Žižić (5), Gordan Giriček (20), Zoran Planinić (8), Marko Tomas (8), Matej Mamić (0), Dalibor Bagarić (0), Mario Kasun (9)
Starters: Planinić, Giriček, Mamić, Vujčić, Bagarić
Head coach: Neven Spahija

Number in parentheses indicates points scored in the game.

2007 Trofeo Diego Gianatti in Bormio, Italy 

 Croatia
Roster: Roko Ukić (0), Davor Kus (11), Marko Popović (13), Marino Baždarić (0), Nikola Prkačin (7), Marko Tomas (6), Zoran Planinić (7), Mario Stojić (dnp), Damir Markota (0), Marko Banić (9), Mario Kasun (16), Stanko Barać (10), Marin Rozić (5), Jure Lalić (0)
Starters: N/A
Head coach: Jasmin Repeša

 Serbia
Roster: Miloš Teodosić (2), Branko Cvetković (4), Vuk Radivojević (0), Zoran Erceg (16), Dragan Labović (11), Mile Ilić (0), Marko Jarić (9), Darko Miličić (11), Nemanja Aleksandrov (0), Aleksandar Rašić (0), Milenko Tepić (2), Milan Gurović (21), Stefan Marković (0), Nenad Mišanović (0), Novica Veličković (0)
Starters: Jarić, Radivojević, Cvetković, Erceg, Miličić
Head coach: Zoran Slavnić

Number in parentheses indicates points scored in the game.

2010 FIBA World Championship 

The first eighth-final round match-up pitted two former Yugoslav republics against each other as Group A winner Serbia met Group B fourth-place finisher Croatia, the first meeting for the teams in a major international tournament.  Serbia prevailed 73–72 in a back-and-forth battle that neither team led by more than eight points at any point during the game.  Milan Mačvan, Serbia's youngest player at age 20, drained a three-pointer to extend Serbia's lead to 64–57 with 4:24 remaining before Croatia began a late comeback to pull within one at 68–67 with 24 seconds left in the game. Aleksandar Rašić hit two free throws to extend the lead to three with 21 seconds left before Croatia's Marko Popović answered with two free throws of his own with 15 seconds left.  Marko Tomas then stole the ensuing inbounds pass and dished to Popović, who was fouled with 11 seconds left.  Popović made only one of two free throws to tie the game at 70 and set up a dramatic finish.

Serbia freed Rašić with a screen on the ensuing inbounds pass and he made an uncontested layup with nine seconds left.  Popović was then fouled with 5.9 seconds left, and hit both free throws to tie the game at 72.  Serbia inbounded the ball to Rašić, who drove downcourt and was fouled by Croatia's Davor Kus while attempting an off-balance shot with one second left.  Rašić made the first and missed the second free throw to give Serbia a one-point victory.  Rašić ended up with 15 points, including eight in the fourth quarter and five in the final 21 seconds.  Croatia's Popović led all scorers with 21 points to go along with five rebounds and five assists.  The Oklahoma City Thunder's Nenad Krstić scored a team-high 16 points for Serbia.

2011 Adecco Ex-Yu Cup in Ljubljana, Slovenia 

The 2011 game was a part of exhibition tournament for the EuroBasket 2011. Serbia had a 80–71 win over Croatia in the tournament final on 9 August 2011. Croatia led for most of the game, seven minutes before the end of the game it reached the 10 points margin, 67–57, but then played very poorly in the game closure. With a 13–0 run, Serbia took the lead, 67–70, two minutes before the end, and then increased its advantage to the final nine point lead, 71–80, by the end of the game. Croatia was led by forward Bojan Bogdanović with 17 points, while center Nenad Krstić was the most efficient in Serbia with 18 points scored.

2011 London Invitational 

Croatian national team was able to successfully open its London Tournament campaign with the initial 83–71 win over rival Serbia. Croatia took the lead just before the end of the first quarter (17–16), led at the half by 44–36 and reached 16-point surplus midway the last quarter before managing to stay on the top. Croatian guard Krunoslav Simon again displayed his excellent shooting stroke while leading the Croatia with 17 points (6–8 from the floor). Croatian center Ante Tomić added 13 points and 9 rebounds.

2012 Adecco Ex-Yu Cup in Ljubljana, Slovenia 

The 2012 game was a part of exhibition tournament for the FIBA EuroBasket 2013 qualification in Slovenia. Croatia and Serbia had a very interesting game on the first day of the Adecco Cup on 3 August 2012. Serbia topped Croatia with final score of 90–74 and proved that they getting better form. Guard Miloš Teodosić led Serbia with great performances as he recorded 14 points, 9 assists and 4 rebounds. Forward Zoran Erceg added 14 points and Duško Savanović scored 13 points. It was obvious at the game that Serbia is much better team. Serbian coach Dušan Ivković even used last quarter to practice offense and defense combinations.

2013 Spor Toto World Cup in Istanbul, Turkey 

On 23 August 2013, Serbia won over Croatia with an 88–71 score, in the first round of the Spor Toto World Cup in Istanbul, Turkey. The Dušan Ivković's team was much better for the most part of the interesting match. They gained a six-point lead at halftime, the Croats then tried to return to the match, but the Serbian players routinely secured a convincing victory with an excellent game in the last quarter. Success against a quality rival is a great encouragement for the Serbian team before participating in the EuroBasket 2013 in Slovenia, and the tournament in Istanbul is the last test before the continental competition. The most efficient in the winning team were captain Nenad Krstić with 19, Raško Katić with 18 and Nemanja Bjelica with 14 points, while Marko Tomas stood out in the Croatian team with 16 points.

2014 Tournament in Pau, France 

Croatia suffered its second defeat at the exhibition tournament in Pau, France, after losing to Serbia 83–84 in overtime on 9 August 2014. In an equal match three minutes before the end, Croatia led 68–60, but the Serbs made 10–0 run in two minutes and took the lead 70–68. But then Croatian guard Oliver Lafayette scored a three-pointer and two free throws for the lead of the Croats 73–70. However, Serbian forward Marko Simonović scored 20 seconds before the game end and tied at 73–73 and the game went into overtime. In the additional five minutes, Croatia was in the lead, but six seconds before the end, Serbian guard Bogdan Bogdanović scored a three-pointer for Serbia's 84–83 lead. In the last run, Croatia tried through forward Bojan Bogdanović, but he missed a three-pointer and Serbia won 84–83 in the end. Serbia took what was offered, and Croatia suffered its defeat. Bojan Bogdanović was the best Croatian scorer with 19 points, and Luka Žorić 13, Damjan Rudež 11, Krunoslav Simon 11, and Oliver Lafayette scored 10 points. The Serbs were led by Marko Simonović with 24 points, Nemanja Bjelica scored 15 points and Miroslav Raduljica with 13 points joined them.

2016 Super4 in Córdoba, Argentina 
The Croats were better for most of the first half. The central player in the composition of the Croats was Krunoslav Simon. By entering the game of Nemanja Nedović Serbia accelerated the game, a series of points from the transition followed, so the nine points minus was reduced to only one. Since Serbian guard Miloš Teodosić was not in the team, the Croats closed all the approaches under the basket, and conditionally speaking, they fired from a distance. Serbia was not served by a shot, but the other guys were up to the task, especially in defense. In the end, in the first half, Croatia led with 40–36. Simon scored 15 points, on the other hand, the central figure in the Serbian team was center Miroslav Raduljica with 11 points. At the beginning of the third section, with a triple by Bogdan Bogdanović, Serbia took the lead with 50–48. The main problem was still the Krunoslav Simon-Dario Šarić duo. Even then, it was clear that a match awaited us in which the nuances would decide. Croatian forward Bojan Bogdanović set up the targets, Raduljica kept Serbia in the game. Five minutes before the end, after Rok Stipčević's triple, the score was tied at 70–70. The Croats have scored 10 three-pointers so far. An uncertain ending followed. Serbian guard Stefan Marković hit a three-pointer for 79–77. Serbian guard Stefan Jović hit a three-pointer in the last second of the attack for 82–77. Croatia was broken at the time. More precisely, a miracle should have happened so that they could return to the match with the Croats. The mistake of the Croats, Nikola Kalinić's dunk from the counter, Bogdanovic's points and practically everything was clear.

2016 Summer Olympics 

Serbia defeated Croatia, 86–83, in the last quarterfinal of the Olympic Basketball Tournament on 17 August 2016 to set up a semifinal clash with Australia.

In the closest game of the day, the Serbs saw a 14-point third quarter lead melt away in the final frame as Croatia got within one several times down the stretch. But with time running out on them, Serbia had to foul to stop the clock and Serbians Miloš Teodosić and Nikola Jokić made good on their trips to the free-throw line in the final 18 seconds. There was little to separate the two teams in the first half, with Serbia up 20–19 at the end of the opening period and Croatia taking a 38–32 advantage at the break. Serbia took control thanks to a third quarter in which they outscored Croatia 34–14. They took their biggest lead of the night, 66–52, when guard Bogdan Bogdanović buried a three-pointer with 22 seconds left in the period. Croatia answered by going on a 22–7 run that got them within 74–73 on Darko Planinić's pair of free-throws with 3:26 remaining. Serbia stayed in front but Croatia were breathing down their neck. The Serbian side got a bit of breathing room when Miroslav Raduljica made the second of two foul shots to make it 79–75 with 27 seconds and that forced Croatia in having to foul intentionally to stop the clock but ultimately running out of time.

Had Serbia rolled to a comfortable win on the back of their impressive third quarter, a great turning point could have been in the shape of Raduljica's postering dunk over Croatian forward Dario Šarić in transition for a 41–40 lead with 6:50 left to play in the period. Instead, the real turning point really came down to Serbia knocking down 6-of-6 free-throws in the dying seconds of the game. Serbia got 39 points from their reserves, compared to 26 for Croatia. Bogdanović (game-high 18 points before fouling out), Stefan Jović (9 points and 4 rebounds) and Milan Mačvan (8 points and 3 rebounds) each played key roles in the outcome of this game. Teodosić and Jokić didn't have huge games offensively, the former going only 2-of-11 for 9 points and the latter 3-of-8 for 12 points. But Teodosić handed out 10 assists and both players stepped up when it counted the most, knocking down shots from the charity stripe with the game on the line.

Statistics
Note: Last updated on 17 August 2016

Comparison in major international tournaments

See also
Croatia–Serbia football rivalry
Croatia–Serbia relations
Yugoslavia men's national basketball team

References

Basketball rivalries
Croatia men's national basketball team
Serbia men's national basketball team
Croatia–Serbia relations